This is a list of singles which have reached number one on the Irish Singles Chart in 1975.

See also
1975 in music
Irish Singles Chart
List of artists who reached number one in Ireland

1975 in Irish music
1975 record charts
1975